is a passenger railway station located in Minami-ku of the city of Okayama, Okayama Prefecture, Japan. It is operated by the West Japan Railway Company (JR West).

Lines

Station layout
The station consists of two opposed elevated side platforms with the station facilities underneath. The station is unattended.

Platforms

Adjacent stations

|-
!colspan=5|JR West

History 
Uematsu Station opened on 20 March 1988.

Passenger statistics
In fiscal 2019, the station was used by an average of 185 passengers daily

Surrounding area
Okayama Prefectural Road No. 21 Okayama Kojima Line
Okayama Prefectural Road No. 22 Kurashiki Tamano Line
Tonogaichi Park

See also
List of railway stations in Japan

References

External links

 JR West Station Official Site

Railway stations in Okayama
Railway stations in Japan opened in 1988